Peter H. McKenzie (April 14, 1845 – June 13, 1929) was a Canadian politician.

Born in Puslinch Township, Wellington County, Canada West, the son of Alexander McKenzie of Ross-shire, Scotland, and Jane McNaughton, of Stirlingshire, Scotland, McKenzie was educated at the Common School in Puslinch. A farmer, McKenzie was a Liberal candidate for Bruce West in 1896, but he was defeated. He was a township and County Councillor in Bruce County. He was President of the Lucknow Agricultural Society and the South Bruce Farmers Institute. He was first elected to the House of Commons of Canada for Bruce South at the general elections of 1904. He was defeated in 1908.

References
 
 The Canadian Parliament; biographical sketches and photo-engravures of the senators and members of the House of Commons of Canada. Being the tenth Parliament, elected November 3, 1904

1845 births
1929 deaths
Liberal Party of Canada MPs
Members of the House of Commons of Canada from Ontario
People from Wellington County, Ontario
Canadian people of Scottish descent